John Spiros (born July 28, 1961) is an American businessman and Republican politician.  He is a member of the Wisconsin State Assembly, representing central Marathon County since 2013.

Early life and career
Born in Akron, Ohio, he graduated from Marietta High School in 1979.  After graduation, he enlisted in the United States Air Force and served six years in the Air Force Security Police.  He served for a time with the 3906th Special Security Squadron, which provided protection for Air Force generals and Strategic Air Command.  He received the U.S. Air Force Commendation Medal and was honorably discharged in 1985.

After leaving the Air Force, he earned his associate's degree in criminal justice from Metropolitan Community College in Omaha, Nebraska, and worked three years as a police officer in Dallas, Texas.  In the 1990s, he went to work for Kaplan Trucking Company and, in 1997, was made director of safety and claims.  Since 2002, he has been vice president of safety and claims management with Roehl Transport, a trucking business based in Marshfield, Wisconsin.

Political career
In 2005, Spiros was elected to the Marshfield Common Council, defeating incumbent Ray Gougeon.  He ultimately served on the common council until 2013, and was president of the council in 2009.  While on the council he served on the Marshfield Industrial Park Commission for seven years.

In 2012, he entered the race for Wisconsin State Assembly in the open 86th Assembly district seat, vacated by Jerry Petrowski, who had been elected to the Wisconsin State Senate.  In the Republican primary, he defeated Wayne Thorson of Marathon, and went on to defeat Democrat Dennis Halkoski in the November general election.  He has subsequently been reelected four times.

In the Assembly, he is chairman of the Assembly Committee on Criminal Justice and Public Safety and co-chair of the Joint Review Committee on Criminal Penalties.  He also serves on the Assembly committees for state affairs, and for transportation, and on the Joint Legislative Council and Joint Committee for Review of Administrative Rules.

In 2016 he received an American Heart Association "Legislator of the Year" award for his work passing a state law requiring CPR training for state middle school students (2015 Wisc. Act 390).

Personal life and family
He and his wife Rebecca live in Marshfield, Wisconsin.  They have five adult children and 4 grandchildren.

In 2009 he was awarded the American Trucking Associations "Safety Director of the Year" award.  He also served on the board of directors for the Transportation Industry Defense Association, a trade association providing education and seminars for transportation companies and attorneys who work on transportation liability issues, and was president of that organization from 2015 to 2017. He received TIDA's John T Biezup Memorial Award in 2021, which was presented at the TIDA Seminar in Philadelphia, PA.  He is a past member of the Central Wisconsin State Fair Board of Directors. He is a member of the Marshfield Elks Club, and a member of the Marathon County Farm Bureau.

References

External links
 
 
 Representative John Spiros at Wisconsin Legislature
 86th Assembly District map (2011–2021)
 Trucking Industry Defense Association

1961 births
Living people
Politicians from Akron, Ohio
People from Marshfield, Wisconsin
Military personnel from Ohio
Businesspeople from Wisconsin
Wisconsin city council members
Republican Party members of the Wisconsin State Assembly
American municipal police officers
American trucking industry businesspeople
21st-century American politicians